The 2010 South American Basketball Championship for Women was the 32nd edition of the FIBA South America Championship for Women. Seven teams featured the competition, held in Santiago, Chile from 10 to August 14. Brazil was the defending champion and retain the title.

Preliminary round

Group A

Group B

Knockout round

5th–7th playoffs

5th–7th semifinals

5th place playoff

Championship

Semifinals

Bronze medal game

Final

Final standings

References

External links
Official website

2010 in women's basketball
Women
2010 in Chilean women's sport
International women's basketball competitions hosted by Chile
Sports competitions in Santiago
South American Basketball Championship for Women
August 2010 sports events in South America
2010s in Santiago, Chile